This is a list of properties and historic districts in West Virginia that are listed on the National Register of Historic Places.  There are listings in every one of West Virginia's 55 counties.

Listings range from prehistoric sites such as Grave Creek Mound, to Cool Spring Farm in the state's eastern panhandle, one of the state's first homesteads, to relatively newer, yet still historical, residences and commercial districts.

Current listings by county

The following are approximate tallies of current listings by county. These counts are based on entries in the National Register Information Database as of April 24, 2008 and new weekly listings posted since then on the National Register of Historic Places web site. There are frequent additions to the listings and occasional delistings and the counts here are approximate and not official.  New entries are added to the official Register on a weekly basis.  Also, the counts in this table exclude boundary increase and decrease listings which only modify the area covered by an existing property or district, although carrying a separate National Register reference number.

See also
List of National Historic Landmarks in West Virginia
List of bridges on the National Register of Historic Places in West Virginia

References

External links

 
West Virginia